Alhaji Minkailu Mansaray is a Sierra Leonean politician, businessman, who was former Sierra Leone minister of mines and mineral resources. He is also the deputy leader of the All People's Congress (APC) party.

An experience career businessman in the insurance industry, Minkailu Mansaray worked many years as an executive at the Sierra Leone National Insurance Company .

Mansaray was an elected member of Parliament from then opposition APC party, and served as a member of Parliament from 2002 to 2007, when the APC became the ruling party. He was Sierra Leone Minister of Labor from 2007 to 2010; and has been Sierra Leone Minister of Mines and Natural Resources since 2010. In 2012, Mansaray was elected deputy leader of the All People's Congress (APC) party.

Mansaray is a senior and long-term member of the All People's Congress party (APC), and is a member of the APC National Advisory Council, a powerful body within the APC, that is made up of the most senior members of the APC party. Mansaray is a close ally of Sierra Leone's president Ernest Bai Koroma.

Mansaray is a graduate of Fourah Bay College. He is a close ally and personal friend of Sierra Leone's president Ernest Bai Koroma, with whom he worked with at the Sierra Leone National Insurance Company.

Mansaray was born in Tonkolili District in the North of Sierra Leone, though he grew up in the capital Freetown. He is a devout muslim of Temne heritage.

Early life and career
Minkailu Mansaray was born in Tonkolili District in the Northern province of Sierra Leone. He is of Temne heritage. Mansaray was born to muslim parents, and he himself is a devout muslim. Mansaray has gone to the Islamic Pilgrimage - Hajj, one of the Five Pillars of Islam. Although he was born in Tonkolili, Mansaray grew up in Freetown.

Mansaray is a graduate of Fourah Bay College. Mansaray spent many years working as an insurance executive at the Sierra Leone National Insurance Company. He worked alongside eventual Sierra Leone's president Ernest Bai Koroma at the Sierra Leone National Insurance Company.

Political career
Minkailu Mansaray is a long-term member of the All People's Congress (APC) party. He was a member of the APC youth league, during his youth days in the East End of Freetown. in 2002, Mansaray was elected member of Parliament APC party and remained a member of parliament until 2007, when the APC became the ruling party, after winning the 2007 Sierra Leone Presidential election, and the APC also won majority of seats in Parliament in the 2007 Parliamentary election.

From 2002 to 2010, Mansaray was appointed minister of Labour and employment, in the first cabinet of Ernest Bai Koroma. He has been Sierra Leone minister of Mines and Mineral Resources since 2010 to present. M

Mansaray is a senior member of the APC party; and is a member of the National Advisory Council, a powerful council within the APC party, that is made up of the most senior members of the APC party. He is also a close ally and personal friend of Ernest Bai Koroma

References

Year of birth missing (living people)
Living people
Government ministers of Sierra Leone
Members of the Parliament of Sierra Leone
People from Tonkolili District